Alfrie Eugene "Tre" Kelley III (born January 23, 1985) is an American professional basketball player for the Fort Wayne Mad Ants of the NBA G League. He played college basketball for the University of South Carolina.

High school career
Kelley grew up in Washington, D.C., where he led Dunbar High School to the inter-high league in Washington, D.C., and lost to Gonzaga in the city championship. He was a three-time all-conference selection and made the all-metropolitan team twice. He was two time Washington D.C. Gatorade player of the year. He averaged 29.7 PPG, 4 RPG and 7.5 APG his junior year and averaged 29 PPG, 5 RPG and 8.3 APG his senior year. Despite being recruited by UConn, Miami, Georgia Tech and West Virginia, he chose to play at the University of South Carolina.

College career
As a freshman, Kelley posted averages of 5.1 points per game 1.4 rebounds per game 2.0 assists per game in 16.1 minutes per game. He had 6 points and 7 rebounds in No. 10 South Carolina's loss to No. 7 Memphis in the first round of the 2004 NCAA Tournament.

As a sophomore, Kelley played in all 33 games, starting 32, leading the team in assists, and tallying second most minutes on the team (1,013 minutes behind Carlos Powell's 1,113). He led the team in assists. Had 8 points and 3 assists in South Carolina's miraculous win over St. Joseph's in the Championship Game in the National Invitation Tournament at Madison Square Garden on March 31, 2005. Kelley earned the Most Assists Award in 2005.

As a junior, Kelley averaged 35.0 mpg, 12.5 ppg, 2.9 rpg, 4.6 apg and 1.3 spg, scored 20+ six times as well as set the school record for starts in a season with 38. He started 70 of USC's previous 71 games but did not start in the 2005 Senior Day vs. Ole Miss. He racked up 20 points and 7 assists in the National Invitation Tournament at Madison Square Garden on March 30, 2006, in which South Carolina routed Michigan 76–64. He was named to the 2006 SEC All-Tournament Team, the 2006 NIT All-Tournament Team. Earned the Most Assist Award in 2006.

As a senior, Kelley averaged 36.7 mpg, 18.9 ppg, 5.1 apg, and 2.6 rpg. Kelley received the 2007 Frances Pomeroy Naismith Award, as well as being a 2007 Chip Hilton Award Finalist. He was named to the 2007 Coaches First Team All-SEC, the 2007 AP First Team All-SEC, the 2007 Gamecock Basketball MVP, and earned the Most Assists Award in 2007.

Kelley started at point guard for three years. He is No. 2 all time in games played (134), No. 3 in assists (510), No. 3 in 3-point FG attempted (503), No. 3 in minutes played (3956), No. 3 in 3 PT FG made (167), and No. 9 all-time in career points (1488).

Professional career
After going undrafted in the 2007 NBA draft, Kelley signed with KK Cibona.

Kelley was signed by the Miami Heat to a non-guaranteed contract on September 26, 2008, but was subsequently waived on October 3, 2008, to make room for Shaun Livingston. He played for Elitzur Ashkelon from the Israeli Basketball Super League during the 2008–09 season.

During the 2009–10 season, Kelley spent time in China and Lebanon. During the 2010–11 season, he spent time in Belgium, China, the NBA D-League, and Venezuela.

In 2011–12, Kelley played in Italy and Venezuela. He returned to the D-League in 2012–13 before playing for Capitanes de Arecibo during the 2013 BSN season.

On October 31, 2013, Kelley was reacquired by the Austin Toros of the NBA Development League. On January 4, 2014, he was traded to the Sioux Falls Skyforce. He later returned to Venezuela and played for Cocodrilos de Caracas.

On September 16, 2014, Kelley signed with Sigma Barcellona of the Italian second division. In January 2015, he left Italy and moved to Turkey where he signed with Pertevniyal.

On September 28, 2015, Kelley signed with the Miami Heat. However, he was later waived by the Heat on October 24 after appearing in two preseason games. On November 2, he signed with the Sioux Falls Skyforce as an affiliate player. On January 29, 2016, he was named in the East All-Star team for the 2016 NBA D-League All-Star Game. On February 19, he was waived by Sioux Falls. Three days later, he signed with Best Balıkesir of the Turkish Second League.

The 2016–17 season, Kelley started in Israel with Hapoel Holon but left the club after appearing in four games. On December 9, 2016, he returned to Best Balıkesir.

On December 21, 2017, Kelley signed with TED Ankara Kolejliler of the Basketbol Süper Ligi.

On December 6, 2019, Kelley was acquired by the Fort Wayne Mad Ants of the G League.

References

External links
Euroleague.net profile
Italian 2nd Division profile 
Greek Basket League profile 
South Carolina Gamecocks bio

1985 births
Living people
American expatriate basketball people in Belgium
American expatriate basketball people in China
American expatriate basketball people in Croatia
American expatriate basketball people in Greece
American expatriate basketball people in Israel
American expatriate basketball people in Italy
American expatriate basketball people in Lebanon
American expatriate basketball people in Turkey
American expatriate basketball people in Venezuela
American men's basketball players
Austin Toros players
Basketball players from Washington, D.C.
BC Oostende players
Best Balıkesir B.K. players
Capitanes de Arecibo players
Cocodrilos de Caracas players
Dunbar High School (Washington, D.C.) alumni
Fort Wayne Mad Ants players
Hapoel Holon players
Ironi Ashkelon players
Israeli Basketball Premier League players
KK Cibona players
Marinos B.B.C. players
Panellinios B.C. players
Pertevniyal S.K. players
Petkim Spor players
Point guards
Shenzhen Leopards players
Sioux Falls Skyforce players
South Carolina Gamecocks men's basketball players
Zhejiang Lions players
Sagesse SC basketball players